The Electoral district of St Kilda was one of the inaugural electoral districts of the Victorian Legislative Assembly, abolished on 2 October 1992.

St Kilda was one of the initial districts created in the first Victorian Legislative Assembly, 1856. It included an area south of the Yarra River and the then villages of St Kilda and Elsternwick.

Members for St Kilda
Two members initially, one after the redistribution of 1889.

Election results

See also
 Parliaments of the Australian states and territories
 List of members of the Victorian Legislative Assembly

References

Former electoral districts of Victoria (Australia)
1856 establishments in Australia
1992 disestablishments in Australia
Constituencies established in 1856
Constituencies disestablished in 1992